Ra'Shede Hageman (born Ra'Shede Knox; August 8, 1990) is an American football defensive tackle for the Daytona Beach team of the American Patriot League (APL). He was drafted by the Atlanta Falcons in the second round of the 2014 NFL Draft. He played college football at Minnesota.

Early years
Ra’shede Hageman was born in Minneapolis with younger brother Xavier. Hageman traveled in, and out of various foster homes in Minneapolis-Saint Paul area, until being adopted at age 7. Hageman’s birth mother battled with alcohol and substance abuse and the birth father was never in the picture. In 1998 Ra’shede and his younger brother were adopted by lawyers Eric Hageman and Jill Coyle.

Hageman attended Washburn High School in Minneapolis, Minnesota where he played basketball and football. On the football field, he played tight end and as a senior he had 11 touchdown receptions. He was ranked by Rivals.com as the sixth best tight end recruit.

College career
Hageman received scholarship offers to play football from Nebraska, Florida, Ohio State, Oklahoma, and Wisconsin, but opted to stay home and play for the University of Minnesota. Hageman moved to the defensive line as a freshman in 2009. He was redshirted that year. As a redshirt freshman in 2010, he played in eight games making five tackles. As a sophomore in 2011, he played in 12 games, recording 12 tackles and two sacks. Starting all 13 games as a junior in 2012, he recorded 35 tackles and six sacks.

Professional career

Hageman was considered one of the top defensive tackle prospects for the 2014 NFL Draft. He was drafted by the Atlanta Falcons in the second round, 37th overall in the 2014 NFL Draft. In his rookie season, he recorded 16 total tackles and one sack.

In the 2015 season, Hageman recorded 27 total tackles and one sack.

In the 2016 season, Hageman recorded 18 total tackles and two sacks. At the end of the 2016 season, Hageman and the Falcons reached Super Bowl LI, where they faced the New England Patriots on February 5, 2017. In the Super Bowl, he had two total tackles as the Falcons fell in a 34–28 overtime defeat.

On September 2, 2017, Hageman was placed on the Commissioner's Exempt List as a result of domestic violence-related charges filed by prosecutors in DeKalb County, Georgia, following a March 2016 incident. He was later released by the Falcons on September 4, 2017.

On April 19, 2019, Hageman was re-signed by the Falcons on a one-year contract after being out of football for two seasons and the domestic violence charge against him was dropped. Not long after re-signing, it was announced that Hageman would be suspended for the first two games of the 2019 season due violating the league's substance abuse policy. He was waived/injured from the reserve/suspended list on September 16, and subsequently reverted to the team's injured reserve list the next day. He was waived from injured reserve on January 13, 2020.

In 2022, Hageman was drafted by the Dayton Beach team of the American Patriot League (APL), which is scheduled to begin play in 2023.

NFL career statistics

Regular season

Postseason

Domestic violence suspension
According to police reports, on March 21, 2016, Hageman entered the home of his girlfriend, Janeal Jefferies, and began throwing things at her, pulling her hair, and verbally abusing her in front of her son. When Jefferies mentioned calling 911, Hageman pulled her phone line and left the home with her cell phone and wallet; after she followed him outside, he reportedly handed her belongings to another man and pushed her down. Upon police arrival, Jefferies was observed to have lacerations on her left elbow and left hand. Hageman was charged with "interference with a call for emergency help, battery family violence and cruelty to children in the third degree" and was suspended by the NFL for 6 games in 2017.

Personal life
In 2011, Hageman's son, Zion, was born.

References

External links
Minnesota Golden Gophers bio

1990 births
Living people
American football defensive ends
American football defensive tackles
Atlanta Falcons players
Minnesota Golden Gophers football players
Players of American football from Minneapolis